S. dentata may refer to:
 Smilisca dentata, the rana-de arbol de Tierras Altas, a frog species endemic to Mexico
 Stygicola dentata, a fish species endemic to Cuba

See also
 Dentata (disambiguation)